Transport in Bolivia is mostly by road. The railways were historically important in Bolivia, but now play a relatively small part in the country's transport system. Because of the country's geography, aviation is also important.

Railways

Total:
3,504 km (single track)
Narrow gauge (metre gauge):
 3,504 km  gauge; (2006)
 The eastern and western networks are joined only via Argentina, due to slow progress on a direct link.
 The map on page 522 of the 1969/1970 edition of JANE'S shows a link between Cuevos and Zudañez as being "under construction".

Rail links with adjacent countries
 Argentina - yes -  both countries
 Brazil - yes -  gauge both countries
 Chile - yes -  gauge both countries; break of gauge where Chile is  gauge
 Peru - Shipping from  railhead in Guaqui to  railhead in Puno across Lake Titicaca, see Peru train ferry

Maps
 UN Map

Towns served by rail

Light Rail

Bolivia's first light rail network is under construction in Cochabamba, and is due to open in 2020.

Cable Car

Bolivia is home to Mi Teleférico, the world's first urban transit network to use cable cars as the primary mode of transportation. This system services the twin cities of El Alto and La Paz, and increased physical and social mobility within Bolivia.

Roadways
Bolivia as of 2004 has 62,479 km of road distance, of which 3,749 km (including 27 km of expressways) is paved and 58,730 km is unpaved.

Road construction in Bolivia is difficult due to its geography and lack of resources to completely develop an advanced road network. However, it maintains a small network of 4-lane freeways which are the following:

1 Oruro - Patacamaya (Expected to be completed in a few years, extending to La Paz). Length: 114 km.
4 Cochabamba - Quillacollo. Length: 14 km.
4 Santa Cruz de la Sierra - Montero. Length: 48 km.

The main national roads are:

 RN1 Desaguadero, border with Peru - La Paz - Oruro - Potosí - Tarija - Bermejo, border with Argentina.
 RN2 Copacabana, border with Peru - La Paz.
 RN3 La Paz - San Borja - Trinidad.
 RN4 Tambo Quemado, border with Chile - Cochabamba - Montero - Santa Cruz de la Sierra - Puerto Suárez, border with Brazil.
 RN5 La Palizada - Sucre - Potosí - Border with Chile.
 RN6 Oruro - Sucre - Chaco, border with Paraguay.
 RN7 Cochabamba - Samaipata - Santa Cruz de la Sierra.
 RN8 Yucumo - Riberalta - Guayaramerín, border with Brazil.
 RN9 Guayaramerín, border with Brazil - Trinidad - Santa Cruz de la Sierra - Yacuíba, border with Argentina
 RN10 Montero - San Matías, border with Brazil.
 RN 14 Potosí - Villazón, border with Argentina.

The Interoceanic Highway is an important highway that connects the Amazonian tripoint border region of Brazil, Peru and Bolivia to the Pacific Ocean. Bolivia's northernmost capital, Cobija, headquarters a free economic zone that uses the Interoceanic Highway to import and export most of its products.

Waterways
10,000 km of commercially navigable waterways (2007)

Ports and harbors

Seaports
 In October 2010, Peru granted Bolivia port facilities and a free-trade zone as part of larger series of agreements strengthening bilateral relations between the two countries. A similar agreement, signed by then Bolivian president Jaime Paz Zamora in 1992, never materialized for a lack of investment in infrastructure. Bolivia has free port privileges in the maritime ports of Argentina, Brazil, and Chile.

Lake Titicaca
 Guaqui

Amazon basin

Paraguay River (international waterway)
 Puerto Aguirre
 Puerto Busch
 Puerto Quijarro

Merchant marine

There is a total of 23 ships ( or over) totaling / in Bolivia.Ships by type as below: (2008)

Airports

There are 1,009 airports in Bolivia as of 2008.

Pipelines
 Crude oil 2,745 km
 Liquid petroleum gas 47 km
 Natural gas 4,883 km
 Refined products 1,589 (2008)

See also
 Bolivia
 Rail transport by country

References

This article was adapted from the CIA World Factbook 2009.

External links